Richard Anthony Williams (born November 21, 1956 in Fort Worth, Texas) is a former Minor League Baseball pitcher and Major League Baseball (MLB) coach who is an MLB scout for the Los Angeles Angels.

Early life
Williams is the son of the late Dick Williams, Hall of Fame manager of six Major League teams between 1967 and 1988.  He attended the University of South Alabama, where he played baseball under former big-league second baseman and manager Eddie Stanky.

Playing career
Williams was signed by the Montréal Expos out of college.  Williams went 3-1 with a 2.90 ERA for the 1977 GCL Expos (completing 3 of 4 starts) and 1-0 in four innings for the Jamestown Expos. In 1978, Williams pitched for the Double-A Memphis Chicks, as he went 7-4 with three saves and a 1.78 ERA.  He was promoted to the Triple-A Denver Bears, where he struggled, going 1-1 with a 9.41 ERA. 

Williams returned to Memphis in 1979 and went 5-7 with five saves and a 3.31 ERA, allowing 46 hits but 44 walks in 68 innings. He made 28 relief appearances and five starts. An arm injury derailed his career. In 1980, Williams was just 1-2 with one save and an ERA of 8.61 for Memphis, allowing 39 hits and 15 walks in 23 innings. In four games for the Class-A West Palm Beach Expos, he allowed 9 hits and five runs in four innings.

Coaching career
Williams was a pitching coach for the Florida Marlins (1995–96) and Tampa Bay Devil Rays (1998–2000).  He later served as special assistant to the general manager for the Devil Rays and a professional scout for the New York Yankees.  He was a scout and special assistant to the general manager for the Atlanta Braves until the 2020 season. The Los Angeles Angels named him a scout on November 22, 2020.

References

External links

Baseball Gauge
Retrosheet
Venezuelan Professional Baseball League

1956 births
Living people
Atlanta Braves scouts
Denver Bears players
Florida Marlins coaches
Gulf Coast Expos players
Jamestown Expos players
Leones del Caracas players
Los Angeles Angels scouts
Major League Baseball pitching coaches
Memphis Chicks players
Montreal Expos scouts
Navegantes del Magallanes players
American expatriate baseball players in Venezuela
New York Yankees scouts
Tampa Bay Devil Rays coaches
Tampa Bay Rays executives
West Palm Beach Expos players